Lúčky is a village and municipality in Ružomberok District in the Žilina Region of northern Slovakia.

History
In historical records the village was first mentioned in 1287.

Geography
The municipality lies at an altitude of 598 metres and covers an area of 21.847 km². In 2006, it had a population of about 1725 people.

References

External links
Municipal website

Villages and municipalities in Ružomberok District